Giovanni Catanese (born 3 January 1993) is an Italian professional footballer who plays as a midfielder for  club Pontedera.

Career
Born in Reggio Calabria, Catanese started his career in Reggina youth sector.

In July 2012, he was loaned to Lega Pro Seconda Divisione club Vigor Lamezia. Catanese made his professional debut on 2 September 2012 against Follonica Gavorrano.

The next 2013–2014 season, he was loaned again to Cuneo. On 18 January 2014, he was loaned to Tuttocuoio for the rest of season.

Catanese left Regiina in 2014, and signed with Serie D club Potenza. He also played for Leonfortese, Foligno and Ghivizzano Borgoamozzano in the four tier.

On 11 June 2017 he joined to Pianese in Serie D. In the club, Catanese won the promotion to Serie C for the 2019–20 season, and he made his Serie C debut on 25 August 2019 against Pro Vercelli.

On 23 July 2020, he signed with Serie C club Pontedera.

References

External links
 
 

1993 births
Living people
Sportspeople from Reggio Calabria
Italian footballers
Association football midfielders
Serie C players
Lega Pro Seconda Divisione players
Serie D players
Reggina 1914 players
Vigor Lamezia players
A.C. Cuneo 1905 players
A.C. Tuttocuoio 1957 San Miniato players
Potenza Calcio players
A.S.D. Città di Foligno 1928 players
U.S. Pianese players
U.S. Città di Pontedera players
Footballers from Calabria